The Re:Zero − Starting Life in Another World anime television series is an adaptation of a light novel series written by Tappei Nagatsuki and illustrated by Shinichirou Otsuka. The adaptation was announced by Kadokawa in July 2015. The series is directed by Masaharu Watanabe and written by Masahiro Yokotani, with animation by the studio White Fox. Kyuta Sakai is serving as both character designer and as chief animation director.

The 25-episode series aired from April 4, 2016 to September 19, 2016 with an extended 50-minute first episode. It was broadcast on TV Tokyo, TV Osaka, TV Aichi, and AT-X. The series was simulcast by Crunchyroll. The series has been licensed by Anime Limited in the United Kingdom.

A series of shorts featuring chibi style versions of the characters, titled  and produced by Studio Puyukai, aired on AT-X after each episode of the series, starting on April 8, 2016. It was replaced by a new series of shorts, titled , which began airing on June 24, 2016. Crunchyroll acquired the streaming rights to both shorts.

The first of two OVA based on the series was released on October 6, 2018, and the second OVA was released on November 8, 2019.

On March 23, 2019, it was announced that a second season was in production.  The cast and staff reprised their roles for the second season.  The second season was announced to be in a split-cour format, with the first half airing from July 8 to September 30, 2020, and the second half airing on January 6, 2021. Before the second season premiered, an edited version of the first season aired from January 1, 2020 on AT-X and other channels, with the edited version recapping the first season through one-hour episodes. It also included new footage. The second season of Re:Zero Break Time was announced and it would air on July 10, 2020 live on Kadokawa's Youtube channel.

Series overview

Episode list

Season 1 (2016)
(Note: In January 2020 a "Director's Cut" of season 1 was released, altering some scenes and repackaging the episodes to be an hour long for a total of 13 episodes.)

Season 2 (2020–21)

OVAs

Specials

Re:Zero! Radio

Re:Zero - Starting Life in Another World Break Time

Re:Zero - Starting Life in Another World Break Time Season 2

Re:PETIT - Starting Life in Another World from PETIT

International broadcast
The series is available with multilingual subtitles on iQIYI in South East Asia, Hong Kong, Macau and Taiwan.
The series is available with English subtitles on MuseAsia YouTube channel and Netflix in South Asia

Notes

References

External links
  at anime official website 
  at Crunchyroll
 
 

Re:Zero Starting Life in Another World